William Martin Kelly (1892–1975), born in Westport, New Zealand was a rugby league football identity who enjoyed success in New Zealand and Australia as both a player and coach in the first half of the 20th century. He played for Wellington, the Balmain Tigers, New South Wales and for both the New Zealand and Australian national sides. He also had a long coaching career with five different clubs in the NSWRFL in the 1920s, 1930s and 1940s, and with New Zealand in 1932.

Early years
Born in Westport, Kelly played first class rugby union for Buller when he was 18 and later represented Wellington.

Playing career
He began playing rugby union for the Westport Rivals club in 1909. In 1910 he was again playing for them and at the end of the season he was selected to play for Buller. His debut representative match for them was against West Coast on September 10. Buller lost 16-0 with Kelly at five eighth. 3 days later he played against Inangahua and scored a try in a 6-3 loss. He then moved to Wellington. Kelly switched to rugby league with the launch of the Wellington Rugby League competition in 1912 and played for Athletic in their grand final loss to Petone.

He became a Wellington representative and toured Australia in 1912 and 1913 with the New Zealand national side. No test matches were played with the Kiwis meeting New South Wales and Queensland and a number of regional sides. He played in Wellingtons 1913 victory over Auckland.

He is listed on the Australian Players Register as Kangaroo No. 90.

He made further representative appearances for New South Wales in 1915 and captain-coached an undefeated Balmain Tigers side to the club's first premiership victory in season 1915. He was the first New Zealander to appear in an NSWRL grand final.

War service
Kelly enlisted in the 1st AIF in 1916 in Sydney. He joined Machine Gun Company No. 9 and embarked for the Western Front on HMAT Benalla in May 1916. He was a Sergeant when he sustained wounds in Belgium which saw him repatriated in October 1917.

Coaching career
 Kelly turned to coaching Sydney teams and guided the Balmain Tigers to the 1939 NSWRL premiership. He coached University (1923–1924), Newtown (1936–1937), Balmain Tigers (1938–1943), St. George Dragons (1944) and Canterbury Bankstown in 1945. After such a long coaching career, Billy Kelly was widely known as the Prince of Coaches.

In 1932 Kelly returned to New Zealand. He coached both New Zealand and Auckland against the 1932 Great Britain team.

Legacy
Since 1997 Australia and New Zealand have contested the Bill Kelly Memorial Cup which is awarded to the winner of transtasman tests.

In 2012 he was named in the Wellington Rugby League's Team of the Century.

Sources
 Whiticker, Alan & Collis, Ian (2006) The History of Rugby League Clubs, New Holland, Sydney
 Whiticker, Alan & Hudson, Glen (2006) The Encyclopedia of Rugby League Players, Gavin Allen Publishing, Sydney
 Heads, Ian and Middleton, David (2008) A Centenary of Rugby League, MacMillan Sydney
 Andrews, Malcolm (2006) The ABC of Rugby League Austn Broadcasting Corpn, Sydney

Footnotes

External links
Bill Kelly at the AIF Project

1892 births
1975 deaths
Auckland rugby league team coaches
Australia national rugby league team players
Balmain Tigers coaches
Balmain Tigers players
Canterbury-Bankstown Bulldogs coaches
Date of birth missing
New South Wales rugby league team players
New Zealand military personnel of World War I
New Zealand national rugby league team coaches
New Zealand national rugby league team players
New Zealand rugby league coaches
New Zealand rugby league players
Newtown Jets coaches
Rugby league centres
Rugby league players from Westport, New Zealand
Rugby union players from Westport, New Zealand
St. George Dragons coaches
Wellington rugby league team players